Vassell is a surname. Notable people with the surname include:

Darius Vassell (born 1980), English footballer
Denton Vassell (born 1984), English boxer
Devin Vassell (born 2000), American basketball player
Isaac Vassell (born 1993), English footballer
Kyle Vassell (born 1992), English footballer
Kadene Vassell (born 1989), Dutch sprinter
Linton Vassell (born 1983), English mixed martial artist

Surnames from status names